The 15th Vuelta a España (Tour of [Spain-nl]), a long-distance bicycle stage race and one of the three grand tours, was held from 29 April to 15 May 1960. Arthur Decabooter won the points classification and Antonio Karmany won the mountains classification.

Teams and riders

Route

Results

References

 
1960 in road cycling
1960
1960 in Spanish sport